Nord Island (ostrov Nord) is an island of the Nordenskiöld Archipelago in the Kara Sea, off the coast of Siberia.

Administratively this island belongs to the Krasnoyarsk Krai Federal subject of Russia and is part of the Great Arctic State Nature Reserve, the largest nature reserve of Russia.

Geography
Nord Island is located in the northeastern area of the Nordenskiöld Archipelago south of the Kolomeitsev Islands. It is part of the Vostyochnyye Islands (Восточные острова) 'Eastern Islands', subgroup of the archipelago. The closest islands are the Yevgeny Fyodorov Islands to the east. There is a 75 m high hill in the NE of the island that has a triangulation station at the top. The southernmost headland is Cape Foka (мыс Фоки).

The climate in the archipelago is severe and the sea surrounding the island is covered with fast ice in the winter and often obstructed by pack ice even in the summer.

History
In 1900, the islands of the Nordenskiöld Archipelago were surveyed by Russian Navy Captain Fyodor Matisen during the first wintering of the Russian polar expedition of 1900–02, but this island remained unnamed.

In 1930 the island was named after ship "Nord" of the Russian Hydrographic Department. Cape Foka, the southern point of the island, was named in 1939 after Georgy Sedov's schooner "Svyatoy Muchenik Foka" (Saint Martyr Foka)

Further reading
Albert Hastings Markham. Arctic Exploration, 1895

References

External links
Ostrov Nord: Russia

Islands of the Nordenskiöld Archipelago
Islands of Krasnoyarsk Krai